Amaury Telemaco Regalado (born January 19, 1974) is a Dominican former professional baseball pitcher, who played in Major League Baseball (MLB) for the Chicago Cubs, Arizona Diamondbacks, and Philadelphia Phillies from  to . He was used both as a starter and reliever, throughout his career. Telemaco attended Cristo Rey High School in La Romana, Dominican Republic.

At 6'3", 222 pounds, this right-hander was originally signed as an undrafted free agent by the Cubs in 1991 and made his major league debut on May 16, 1996, at the age of 22, pitching seven innings against the Houston Astros for the win. He gave up only one hit, but he did walk four batters.

Overall, Telemaco went 23-35 in his career with a 4.94 earned run average (ERA). He struck out 364 batters in 561 innings pitched. Telemaco was a typical hitter for a pitcher, batting .121 in 116 career at bats, striking out 51 times. He did hit one triple in his career, though. Telemaco committed two career errors for a .958 fielding percentage.

Telemaco is currently a pitching coach in Minor League Baseball (MiLB). In  he served his fifth consecutive season in that post for the Rookie-level Dominican Summer League Red Sox, an affiliate of the MLB Boston Red Sox.

Personal life
His son, Amaury Telemaco, Jr., was signed as a non-drafted free agent by the Los Angeles Dodgers in 2017.

References

External links

Amaury Telemaco at Baseball Gauge

1974 births
Arizona Diamondbacks players
Chicago Cubs players
Clearwater Phillies players
Daytona Cubs players
Dominican Republic expatriate baseball players in South Korea
Dominican Republic expatriate baseball players in the United States
Huntington Cubs players
KBO League pitchers
Iowa Cubs players

LG Twins players
Living people
Major League Baseball pitchers
Major League Baseball players from the Dominican Republic
People from La Altagracia Province
Peoria Chiefs players
Philadelphia Phillies players
Reading Phillies players
Scranton/Wilkes-Barre Red Barons players
Tucson Sidewinders players